John Humphrey Arnott Pakington, 7th Baron Hampton (born 24 December 1964) is a British hereditary peer and a crossbench member of the House of Lords.

Lord Hampton became a member of the House in October 2022, being elected in a crossbench hereditary peers' by-election.

He lives in Hackney, London and has previously worked as a photographer, and Head of Department in a local state school.

References

1964 births
Living people
7
People from Hackney, London

Hereditary peers elected under the House of Lords Act 1999